Stanley George Miller (born October 10, 1940), better known as Mouse or Stanley Mouse, is an American artist who is notable for his 1960s psychedelic rock concert poster designs and album covers for the Grateful Dead, Journey, and other bands.

Personal life
Born in Fresno, California, Miller grew up in Detroit, Michigan. He was given the nickname Mouse as a ninth grader. He was expelled from Mackenzie High School (Michigan) in 1956 for mischievously repainting the façade at The Box, a popular restaurant across the street from Mackenzie. Following his junior year at nearby Cooley High School, Mouse completed his formal education at Detroit's Society of Arts and Crafts.

By 1958, Mouse had become fascinated by the Weirdo hot rod art movement that had begun in California a decade earlier. Having developed skills using an airbrush he began painting T-shirts at custom car shows. There he met and worked with Ed "Big Daddy" Roth, the leading exponent of Weirdo Hot Rod art. Mouse was also strongly influenced by the art of Rick Griffin, with whom he would later collaborate on posters and album covers. In 1959, Mouse and his family founded Mouse Studios, a mail-order company, which sold his products. In 1964, he was invited to help in the design of Monogram automobile model kits using the "monster" cartoon characters he had developed to compete with Roth's "Rat Fink" character.

In 1966–1967, Mouse and Alton Kelley lived and worked from 715 Ashbury (across the street from the house where The Grateful Dead lived at 710 Ashbury).

Psychedelic posters
In 1965, Mouse travelled to San Francisco, California with a group of art school friends. Settling initially in Oakland, Mouse met Alton Kelley. Kelley, a self-taught artist, had recently arrived from Virginia City, Nevada, where he had joined a group of hippies who called themselves the Red Dog Saloon gang. Upon arrival in San Francisco Kelley and other veterans of the gang renamed themselves The Family Dog, and began producing rock music dances. In 1966, when Chet Helms assumed leadership of the group and began promoting the dances at the Avalon Ballroom, Mouse and Kelley began working together to produce posters for the events. Later the pair also produced posters for promoter Bill Graham and for other events in the psychedelic community. From September 1967  through December 1967 Mouse and Kelley created psychedelic posters for shows at Helms’ The Family Dog Denver.

In 1967, Mouse collaborated with artists Kelley, Rick Griffin, Victor Moscoso and Wes Wilson to create the Berkeley Bonaparte Distribution Agency. Mouse and Kelley also worked together as lead artists at Mouse Studios and The Monster Company, producing album cover art for the bands Journey and Grateful Dead. The Monster Company also developed a profitable line of T-shirts, utilizing the four color process for silk screening.

The psychedelic posters Mouse and Kelley produced were heavily influenced by Art Nouveau graphics, particularly the works of Alphonse Mucha and Edmund Joseph Sullivan. Material associated with psychedelics, such as Zig-Zag rolling papers, were also referenced. Producing posters advertising for such musical groups as Big Brother and the Holding Company, Quicksilver Messenger Service, and Grateful Dead led to meeting the musicians and making contacts that were later to prove fruitful.

Later career

In 1968, Helms and Graham began turning to other artists for their poster work, and Mouse's career languished. After brief periods in London and Massachusetts, he moved to Toronto where he ran a Yorkville waterbed store called The Waterbed Gallery—with the walls featuring his artwork. Mouse returned to California to live in Marin County near Kelley. The pair resumed their partnership in 1971, producing commercial artwork related to the Grateful Dead and later Journey. The pair are credited with creating the skeleton and roses image that became the Grateful Dead's archetypal iconography, and Journey's wings and beetles that appeared on their album covers from 1977 to 1980. In 1977, Mouse, with Kelley, created the Styx album cover for The Grand Illusion with a pastiche of René Magritte. Mouse and Kelley continued to work together on rock memorabilia until 1980.
Mouse continued to produce album cover art and other music-related graphics through the 1980s. Early in the decade, he moved to New Mexico where he began producing fine art in a variety of media. In 1999, he contributed a portrait of Skip Spence to the tribute album, More Oar: A Tribute to the Skip Spence Album, being a collection of cover versions of songs by the co-founder of Moby Grape performed by such artists as Beck, Tom Waits and Robert Plant.

Stanley Mouse filed a lawsuit against the producers of the film Monsters, Inc. in 2002, alleging that the characters of Mike and Sulley were based on his drawings of Excuse My Dust, which he unsuccessfully pitched to Hollywood producers in 1998. A Disney spokeswoman responded that the characters in Monsters, Inc were "developed independently by the Pixar and Walt Disney Pictures creative teams, and do not infringe on anyone's copyrights".

Mouse now lives in Sonoma County, California where he continues to paint and create music.

Bibliography

References

External links
Stanley Mouse Studio website

Psychedelic artists
American illustrators
20th-century American painters
American male painters
21st-century American painters
Painters from California
1940 births
Living people
Album-cover and concert-poster artists
Artists from the San Francisco Bay Area
Mackenzie High School (Michigan) alumni
20th-century American male artists